Ravina II or Rabina II (Hebrew: רב אבינא בר רב הונא or רבינא האחרון; died 475 CE or 500 CE) was a Babylonian rabbi of the 5th century (seventh and eighth generations of amoraim).

He, along with his teacher Rav Ashi, were considered "the end of Hora'ah (teaching)". Traditionally both of them are regarded as responsible for redacting the Babylonian Talmud.

Biography
Most scholars agree that the rabbi here in question was Ravina the son of R. Huna, and not Ravina II, the colleague of Rav Ashi who died before Rav Ashi.

He did not remember his father, R. Huna, who died while Ravina was still a child, but the Talmud states several times that his mother communicated to him the opinions held by his father. After his father's death, his maternal uncle Ravina I became his guardian.

Ravina II officiated as judge at Sura shortly after Rav Ashi's death, and was a colleague of Mar bar Rav Ashi, although he was not so prominent. After Rabbah Tosafa'ah's death, Ravina became, for a year (474), director of the Sura Academy. Simultaneously, Rabbah Jose served as head of the Pumbedita academy. Ravina served as leader of the Jewish community in Babylonia for 22 years. One year before his death, all the Babylonian synagogues were closed, and Jewish infants were handed over to the Magians. He died on the 13th of Kislev in 474/475 or 499/500 CE.

References

Rabbis of Academy of Sura
Year of birth unknown
475 deaths
Talmud
Talmud rabbis of Babylonia
500 deaths